Civil Aviation Technology College is a college in Tehran, Iran specializing in civil aviation. It is also called the Higher Education Center because it is a university candidate. Civil Aviation Technology College Established in 1949, Civil Aviation Technology College is the pioneering center in the field of civil aviation Training. The College conducts its training programs in line with rules & regulations of Iranian Ministry of Higher Education and also requirements of aviation industry.

Founded in the 1949, it is the most accredited aviation college in Iran which also accepts students by UEE.  Most graduates of this school are among elite key people in aviation and oil and gas industry worldwide. Civil Aviation Technology College is located on Meraj Street at the Mehrabad International Airport.

Name 
Before its official establishment, it was called the Aero Club (in Persian: باشگاه خلبانی). In the early years of its establishment, that is, from the 1940s, was a special school dedicated to the entire Civil Aviation, (in Persian:مرکز آموزش عالی اختصاصی سازمان هواپیمایی کشور) after the revolution, it was also known with that name. After that, it became the Civil Aviation technology College (in Persian: دانشکده صنعت هواپیمایی کشوری), and since 2005 in the Ministry of Science, it has been known as the Higher Aviation and Airport Higher Education Institute of the country. (In Persian: مؤسسه آموزشی عالی هوانوردی و فرودگاهی کشور)

However, it is still a term called the Civil Aviation Technology College. Therefore, the college forecast is a plan to add higher values and disciplines that have been dropped over the course of the College (for example, piloting) and new disciplines (such as avionics engineering) In the future, the College name will be changed to the University of Aerospace and Aviation educations or something like that.

Ranking 

 Ranked first in the best technology college in Iran
 Among the top 20 colleges in the Middle East
 Ranked first in the Middle East Aviation College and second in the Middle East Aviation School
 32nd World Aviation School
 Ranked first Aviation Technology school in the world
 Ranked first in the provision of electronics and telecommunications among aviation schools
 The first school offering aviation electronics and aviation communications in the field of electricity

Departments 
The college has the following departments:
 Aircraft  maintenance Engineering 
 Aviation Electronics and Telecommunications Engineering
 Aviation & Air traffic control Engineering
Arts & Science
Short Courses

Courses

Electrical Engineering, Specialty of Aviation Telecommunications 
This course is also called Aviation-Telecommunications Engineering. Aviation-telecommunication engineers include a group of specialists who have a lot of information about the flight (such as meteorological data, some specific information, etc.) through the available platforms (such as AFTN, etc.) at the disposal of the aircraft itself or parts Others are stationed at airports. Specialists in this field mainly need knowledge of computer, networking, IT and physics. Their works are in organizations and companies in the air and space.

Electrical Engineering, Aviation Electronics Specialty 
This course is also called Aviation-Electronic Engineering. Before, during and after the flight, the aircraft needs equipment and platforms that meet many of its needs such as navigation information, communication and monitoring systems (CNS). Of course, such equipment requires installation, commissioning, maintenance and repair, which is a serious task for an aviation electronics specialist at the airports.

Aircraft maintenance engineering 
An aircraft maintenance engineer or licensed aircraft maintenance engineer, is a licensed person who carries out and certifies aircraft maintenance. The license is widespread internationally and is recognised by the International Civil Aviation Organization. Aircraft maintenance course includes theoretical and practical courses in the field of familiarity with different parts of the aircraft, including fuselage and engine, parts, how to operate and description of their duties, how to maintain and maintain in optimal and usable conditions, safe methods and safety principles Work environment, familiarity with the equipment and tools used in the work environment and the correct way to work with them, general familiarity with the mechanism of different parts and parts of the aircraft, practical work in various training workshops in the field of jet and piston engines and many other cases.

Air traffic engineering (controllers) 

This course is also called Flight Care Engineering. For more information; See:Air traffic controller.

Avionics engineering 
Avionics engineering is similar, but deals with the electronics side of aerospace engineering.

Short courses

Turbine Aircraft Maintenance Technician Course 
The graduates of this course will be introduced to the flight standard office of the Civil Aviation Organization while obtaining the certificate of passing the course. Holders of this certificate must refer to one of the airlines to gain 2 years of work experience and after passing this period and obtaining the performance approval from that airline, they will be introduced to the Civil Aviation Organization to receive their main certificate. Holders of this certificate, according to the Civil Aviation Organization, are authorized to issue safety certificates for aircraft and its components (in engine and fuselage parts - mechanical equipment) for flight.

Holders of relevant academic degrees such as: Mechanics and Aerospace can apply for a B1-1 Certificate by choosing an adaptive course with a shorter course duration.

Avionic Maintenance Technician Course 
Graduates of this course will be introduced to the flight standard office of the Civil Aviation Organization while obtaining the certificate of passing the course, and after confirming the transcripts sent by the faculty, they will succeed in obtaining a temporary B2 type certificate, which means passing the organization's written exams. Holders of this certificate must refer to one of the airlines to gain 2 years of work experience and after passing this period and obtaining the performance approval from that airline, they will be introduced to the Civil Aviation Organization to receive their main certificate. Holders of this certificate are authorized by the Civil Aviation Authority to issue safety certificates for aircraft and its components (in the electrical and electronic parts of aircraft) for flight.

Holders of relevant academic degrees such as: various majors in electrical engineering can apply for a B2 certification by choosing a comparative course with a shorter course duration.

Airplane Ticketing 
This training course is in both introductory and advanced levels. Each course is held for two weeks.

Objectives 
1.     Participating in training the required specialized manpower in aviation industry

2.     Proper preparation for satisfying technical and higher education needs in the above mentioned fields

3.     Taking advantage of the present potential capacities of Iran to develop and expand aviation technology

Notable alumni  
Due to the relocation and renaming of this college and the change of teaching disciplines throughout history, people may have studied in disciplines and places that are not currently part of the college now.

 Effat Tejaratchi, the first Iranian female pilot
 Fatimeh Pahlavi, daughter of Reza Shah and her tenth child, pilot
 Houshang Shahbazi, Iranian passenger pilot, flight engineering
 Akram Monfared Arya, Iranian female pilot

Gallery

See also 

 Aircraft maintenance engineer (Canada)
 Air traffic controller
 Air traffic control
 Telecommunication engineer
 Electronic Engineering

References

Schools in Tehran
Universities in Tehran
Universities in Iran
Educational institutions established in 1949
1949 establishments in Iran